Joan Mary Gale Robinson (née Thomas; 10 February 1910 – 20 August 1988) was a British author and illustrator of children's books.

Profile 

She published her first book for children in 1939. She married writer and illustrator Richard Gavin Robinson in 1941. They lived in King's Lynn, Norfolk.

When Marnie Was There (1967), her first young adult novel, was shortlisted for the Carnegie Medal that year. Hayao Miyazaki selected Marnie as one of his fifty recommended children's books, and Studio Ghibli adapted it into a film of the same name.

Select bibliography

For children

For young adults

References

Notes

External links
  Some works were published as Joan Thomas (maiden name).
 
 .

1910 births
1988 deaths
British children's book illustrators
British children's writers
British writers of young adult literature